Jare Henrik Tiihonen (born 22 December 1981 Vantaa, Finland), better known by his stage name Cheek, is a Finnish former rapper. During his career, he released nine studio albums.

In November 2017, he officially announced that he would end his career in August 2018.

Discography

2001: Human & Beast
2002: 50/50
2003: Pitää pystyy elää
2003: Avaimet mun kulmille
2005: Käännän sivuu
2007: Kasvukipuja
2007: Kuka sä oot
2009: Jare Henrik Tiihonen
2010: Jare Henrik Tiihonen 2
2012: Sokka irti
2013: Kuka muu muka
2015: Alpha Omega
2018: Timantit on ikuisia

See also
List of best-selling music artists in Finland

References

Living people

1981 births

Finnish hip hop musicians

People from Lahti
People with bipolar disorder
Finnish twins
Finnish rappers